Melih Rauf Esenbel (March 15, 1915 – July 27, 1995) was a Turkish diplomat and former Minister of Foreign Affairs.

Early years
Melih Rauf was born 1915 in Istanbul. He was educated in law at Istanbul University following his graduation from Galatasaray High School.

In 1936, he entered in the service of the Ministry of Foreign Affairs as a probationary clerk. He left the post in 1937 due to his conscription.

Esenbel reentered the ministry after completing his military service in 1938, working first in the Economy Department and then in 1939 in the Commerce Department. The same year, he was appointed chancellor of the embassy in Paris, France. In 1940, he was promoted to the post of Third Secretary. After becoming Second Secretary in Paris, he returned home in 1943 to serve in the Protocols Department of the ministry. Esenbel worked first as Secondary Secretary, and later was promoted to Department Director.

In 1945, Esenbel was appointed Principal Secretary to the Counselor at the Embassy of Washington D.C., United States, where he served also as Counselor some time later.

From 1952 on, his further posts were at the ministry in Ankara, where he filled several executive positions becoming finally Secretary General of the ministry in 1957.

On February 17, 1959, Esenbel, in his capacity as the Secretary General of the Ministry of Foreign Affairs, accompanied Prime minister Adnan Menderes (in office 1950-1960), who was on the way to London, UK, to sign the London Agreement on the Cyprus issue with British Prime Minister Harold Macmillan and Greek Prime Minister Constantine Karamanlis. The charter flight of the Turkish Airlines carrying eight crew and a delegation of 18 government officials from Ankara via Istanbul and Rome, Italy, to London was diverted to Gatwick Airport due to poor visibility at Heathrow. The aircraft of type Vickers Viscount crashed in a wood during its final approach to land in extensive fog, and caught fire. Five of the crew and nine of the passengers died in the crash while Melih Esenbel was among the survivors with light injuries only. The prime minister survived without any injury.

Career
In 1960, he served as Ambassador to Washington, D.C. from March 24 to October 28. Returned to Turkey, Esenbel became High Counselor to the Secretary General on December 1, 1960.

Esenbel's next foreign position took him to Tokyo, Japan, where he acted as ambassador from January 1, 1963 to January 1, 1966. On January 9, 1967, he was appointed the second time to the Embassy in the USA serving at this post until November 1, 1974.

Prime minister Sadi Irmak, who was tasked by President Fahri Korutürk with forming of a caretaker government, appointed Melih Esenbel as Minister of Foreign Affairs. He served at this post from November 13, 1974 until March 30, 1975, the resignation of the cabinet due to a vote of no confidence in the parliament.

On April 1, the same year, Esenbel became for the third time Ambassador to Washington, D.C., where he acted until July 14, 1979. After completion of his duty in the USA, he returned home and was promoted to Minister-Counselor. On August 23, 1979, Melih Esenbel retired.

Personal life
Melih Esenbel died on July 27, 1995 in Istanbul. He was survived by his wife Emine and his two children. He was laid to rest at the family grave in Yahya Effendi Tekkesi graveyard.

References

Bibliography 
 
 

1915 births
Diplomats from Istanbul
Galatasaray High School alumni
Istanbul University Faculty of Law alumni
Survivors of aviation accidents or incidents
Ambassadors of Turkey to Japan
Ambassadors of Turkey to the United States
Ministers of Foreign Affairs of Turkey
Grand Crosses with Star and Sash of the Order of Merit of the Federal Republic of Germany
1995 deaths